The 2005 Billboard Music Awards were held December 6, 2005 at the MGM Grand Garden Arena in Las Vegas, Nevada. The awards recognized the most popular artists and albums from 2005. Green Day and 50 Cent dominated the awards this year, with both winning 6 awards each.

Performances

Winners and nominees
Winners are listed in bold.

References

External links

2005
Billboard awards
2005 in American music
2005 in Nevada
2005 music awards
MGM Grand Garden Arena